Sheol (Šəʾōl, Tiberian: Šŏʾōl) in the Hebrew Bible is a place of still darkness which lies after death. Although not well defined in the Tanakh, Sheol in this view was a subterranean underworld where the souls of the dead went after the body died.

Within the Hebrew Bible, there are few – often brief and nondescript – mentions of Sheol, seemingly describing it as a place where both the righteous and the unrighteous dead go, regardless of their moral choices in life. The implications of Sheol within the texts are therefore somewhat unclear; it can be interpreted as either a generic metaphor describing "the grave" into which all humans invariably descend, or, it may be interpreted as representing an actual state of afterlife within Israelite thought. Though such practices are forbidden, the inhabitants of Sheol can, under some circumstances, be summoned by the living, as when the Witch of Endor calls up the spirit of Samuel for Saul.

While the Hebrew Bible appears to describe Sheol as the permanent place of the dead, in the Second Temple period (roughly 500 BCE–70 CE) a more diverse set of ideas developed. In some texts, Sheol is considered to be the home of both the righteous and the wicked, separated into respective compartments; in others, it was considered a place of punishment, meant for the wicked dead alone, and is equated with Gehenna in the Talmud. When the Hebrew scriptures were translated into Greek in ancient Alexandria around 200 BCE, the word "Hades" (the Greek underworld) was substituted for Sheol, owing to its similarities to the Underworld of Greek mythology. The gloss of Sheol as "Hades" is reflected in the New Testament where Hades is both the underworld of the dead and the personification of the evil it represents.

Hebrew Bible
Sheol is mentioned 66 times throughout the Hebrew Bible. The first mentions of Sheol within the text associate it with the state of death, and a sense of eternal finality. Jacob avows that he will "go down to Sheol" still mourning the apparent death of his son Joseph. Later on, the same formula is repeated when describing the sorrow that would befall Jacob should another of his sons, Benjamin, not return to Israel with his remaining brothers.

Sheol makes its next appearance during the episode of Korah in the Book of Numbers. After Korah attempts to rouse the Israelites to rebel against Moses, Moses vows that Yahweh will prove his legitimacy by splitting open the earth to hurl Korah and his conspirators into Sheol. Sure enough, as he finishes his speech, Yahweh splits the earth open, causing Korah, his family, and all of his possessions to, as the text describes it, "enter Sheol alive." In Deuteronomy, Moses sings that the anger of Yahweh is a flame which burns in the "depths" of Sheol, consuming the entire earth from the bottom up.

Subsequent mentions of Sheol in the Tanakh codify it as emblematic of the death which necessitates one's entry into it. 1 Samuel describes Yahweh as the one who brings souls down to Sheol, and 2 Samuel further cements Sheol as humanity's ultimate destination, post-mortem. 1 Kings uses "going down to Sheol" as a metaphor for death, describing those who go down to it both "in peace" and "in blood". 

The prophet Isaiah expounds on Sheol to great lengths during some of his sermons, personifying it as possessing an ever-increasing hunger for living men, with a great propensity for the souls of sinners, and where pleas to Yahweh cannot escape. Ezekiel, during his prophecy of Egypt's downfall, describes Egypt metaphorically descending into Sheol as a dead man would, where all the spirits of the dead, as well as other fallen empires, such as Assyria, jeer and mock its fall from might.

The remaining mentions of Sheol lie in the poetic literature of the Hebrew Bible. Job mentions Sheol in several of his laments, calling it his "home" as he lies in anguish,  and yearning for death to take him there to put an end to his suffering. Sheol is also mentioned in several Psalms, again, as the grave of humanity.

Other biblical names for Sheol were: Abaddon (ruin), found in Psalm 88:11, Job 28:22 and Proverbs 15:11; and Shakhat (corruption), found in Isaiah 38:17, Ezekiel 28:8.

Interpretation

Even within the realm of Jewish thought, the understanding of Sheol was often inconsistent. This would later manifest, in part, with the Sadducee–Pharisee ideological rift which, among other things, disagreed on whether relevancy should lie more prominently in the world of living or in the realm of an afterlife. The lack of a clear belief structure surrounding Sheol lends the idea to a number of interpretations: namely, one which imagines Sheol as a concrete state of afterlife, or one which envisions Sheol as a metaphor for death as a whole. To the latter's end, certain editions of the Bible translate the term Sheol as generic terms such as "grave" or "pit" (KJV, NIV, etc.), while others (NAB, NASB, etc.) preserve it as a proper noun. Distinguishing Sheol between a realm and a metaphor is the crux of several unanswered questions surrounding its nature.

Perhaps owing to the evolution of its interpretation, certain elements of Sheol as described in the Hebrew Bible appear contradictory. Those in Sheol remember nothing, not even Yahweh, yet elsewhere its inhabitants possess an otherwise impossible perception of earthly events, even those which occur after their demise. Pleas to Yahweh cannot escape Sheol, and yet, Yahweh remains its unequivocal master. Those who descend into Sheol cannot escape it, yet Yahweh raises souls from it. Furthermore, despite the evidently abstract nature of Sheol, there is some physicality to it: it was clearly understood to be subterranean, which is further supported by its association with the term bōr ("pit"), found in Isaiah 14:15, 24:22, and Ezekiel 26:20. It is a "land" (eretz), contains "gates", is apparently compartmentalized, and there are numerous mentions of its "deepest depths" and "farthest corners". The idea that both the righteous and unrighteous eventually descend to Sheol appears to be an unspoken assumption in the Hebrew Bible - thus Jacob and David have no reservation in acknowledging their eventual residency, even as the later prophets spoke of Sheol lying in wait for the wicked. 

The origins of the concept of Sheol is debated. The general characteristics of an afterlife such as Sheol were not unique to the ancient Israelites, the Babylonians had a similar underworld called Aralu, and the Greeks had one known as Hades. As such, it is assumed that the early Israelites apparently believed that the graves of family, or tribe, all united into one, collectively unified "grave", and that this is what the Biblical Hebrew term Sheol refers to: the common grave of humans. Therefore, the family tomb is the central concept in understanding biblical views of the afterlife. It is "not mere sentimental respect for the physical remains that is...the motivation for the practice, but rather an assumed connection between proper sepulture and the condition of happiness of the deceased in the afterlife".

Wojciech Kosior has argued that "Sheol" in the Hebrew Bible refers to an underworld deity. Some additional support for this hypothesis comes from the ancient Near Eastern literary materials. It has been proposed that Sheol is the Hebrew derivative of Shuwala (Akkadian: 𒋗𒉿𒆷 šu-wa-la), an underworld goddess of Hurrian origin, attested in Hattusa in Anatolia, Emar and Ugarit in Syria, and Ur in Mesopotamia, often alongside other underworld deities such as Allani or Ugur. According to Assyriologist Lluis Feliu, a connection between Sheol and Shuwala is "possible, but not certain". Edward Lipiński regards this connection as proven, but relies on the assumption that Shuwala is one and the same as Allani, which is seemingly contradicted by texts from Ur and Hattusa in which they appear as two distinct deities. Some scholars argue that Sheol understood anthropomorphically fits the semantic complex of the other ancient Near Eastern death deities such as Nergal, Ereshkigal or Mot.

The Second Temple Period wrought several radical theological changes within the Israelite population, and marked the transition from Israelite religion to modern Judaism. The idea of Sheol underwent extensive modification and became widely diversified, with a newfound plethora of interpretations. With the codification of Rabbinical Judaism and the Talmud, Jewish theology concerning the afterlife had largely abandoned the concept of a single destination for all mankind after death and adopted the more recognizable model which espoused a place of reward for the righteous, and a place of punishment for the wicked called Gehinnom. Subsequently, Sheol, and the related terms Abaddon, Bor, Shakhat, etc., were reduced to synonyms for this realm of punishment.

Mandaeism
In Mandaeism, the World of Darkness (i.e., the underworld) is sometimes referred to as Sheol in the Ginza Rabba and other Mandaean scriptures.

See also
 Barzakh
 Biblical cosmology
 Christian views on Hades
 Eirene (goddess)
 Hel (being)
 Hellenistic Judaism
 Limbo of the Patriarchs
 Shalim
 Spirit world (Latter Day Saints)
 Tartarus
 World of Darkness (Mandaeism)
 Xibalba

References

Bibliography

External links 

 Sheol entry in Jewish Encyclopedia

Hebrew words and phrases
Jewish underworld
Jewish theology
Religious cosmologies